Gauge Precision Instruments (originally Gauge, Inc.) is a U.S.-based designer and importer of audio electronics and accessories for professional and consumer markets. The company was founded by Chandler R. Bridges, Jr. and Robert C. Chiarelli in Beverly Hills, CA in 2008. Gauge Precision Instruments' most prevalent product categories are microphones and audio accessories. In January 2012, the company expanded and opened new offices in Tallahassee, Florida. In early 2017, Chiarelli sold his shares to Jeffry Piergeorge.

History 
In 2007 Chandler Bridges and Rob Chiarelli begin experimentation in loudspeaker and microphone design. In 2008 Gauge Precision Instruments introduces the ECM-87, their first cardioid condenser microphone. Gauge introduced the ECM-47 in 2009, their first multi-pattern Tube microphone. That year Gauge also introduced the USB-87, a Universal Serial Bus powered microphone designed specifically for use with the personal computer, and the ECM-84 and ECM-84SE, their first small diaphragm electret condenser microphone. In 2010, the company introduced the ECM-58, their first hand-held dynamic microphone. The ECM58 was discontinued in April, 2012 and the company introduced the ECM87 Stealth Microphone, an alternate version of the ECM87 Classic. In 2013, the company introduced the MP-1073, their first microphone preamplifier.

Microphones 

Gauge microphones were first introduced at the TAXI Music Convention in 2009 in Los Angeles, CA and later gained notoriety with recording artists Miriam Grey, Miranda Cosgrove, Kanye West, Usher, Kelly Clarkson, Club Nouveau and during the 2009 American Music Awards telecast.  They have also been used by NBC, Nickelodeon, Sony and Warner Brothers television networks and in recordings by notable arrangers Paul Buckmaster and Benjamin Wright.

Among its professional products, especially noteworthy is the ECM-87 (introduced in 2008) and its successors and alternate versions, which include the ECM-87A, the ECM-87 Stealth, the ECM-47, the ECM-84 and the ECM-84SP. Many personal and professional recording studios use the Gauge ECM-87, ECM-47, ECM-58 and ECM-84 microphones as a solution for general use in a variety of musical styles, voice-over and narration.

Design
The original ECM-87 microphone design is based on conventional microphone circuitry and design with various proprietary modifications to the capsule and components.  The Gauge  ECM-47 is a multi-pattern vacuum tube microphone which utilizes the 6072 low-noise vacuum tube.  Gauge has a unique quality control process that employs multi-platinum audio engineers to hand select their microphones.

Current models

Accessories 
Pop Filters
Audio Cables
Microphone Shock Mount

See also 
List of microphone manufacturers

References

External links

Electronics companies established in 2008
Companies based in Beverly Hills, California
Privately held companies based in California
Audio equipment manufacturers of the United States
Microphone manufacturers
2008 establishments in California